is a former Japanese football player.

Playing career
Yoshimi was born in Yamagata Prefecture on June 16, 1982. After graduating from high school, he joined the J2 League club Montedio Yamagata in 2001. He debuted against Vegalta Sendai on October 13. He also played against Sagan Tosu on October 17. He only played these two matches before moving to the Japan Football League club Sagawa Printing in 2003. There he played many matches as a regular player. He retired at the end of the 2003 season.

Club statistics

References

External links

1982 births
Living people
Association football people from Yamagata Prefecture
Japanese footballers
J2 League players
Japan Football League players
Montedio Yamagata players
SP Kyoto FC players
Association football midfielders